The Isle of Man partially elects its legislature at the national level. The High Court of Tynwald consists of two chambers. The House of Keys has 24 members, elected in a general election for a five-year term in 12 two-seat constituencies. Each voter has two votes (but may choose to vote for only one candidate) and in each constituency the two candidates with the most votes are elected. The Legislative Council has 11 members: three ex-officio members and eight other members who are elected by the House of Keys for a five-year term. Political parties do not play an important role on the Island. The Isle of Man lowered its voting age from 18 to 16 in 2006.

General elections
The House of Keys has 24 members, elected in a General Election for a five-year term in 12 two-seat constituencies. The Legislative Council has 11 members: three ex-officio members and eight other members who are elected by the House of Keys for a four-year term.

Local elections

There are elections for commissioners and councillors for the 21 local authorities on the Isle of Man, consisting of 4 town authorities, 2 district authorities, 2 village authorities, and 13 parish authorities.

 2016 Manx Local Authority elections
 2021 Manx Local Authority elections

Board of Education elections
Elections took place for the Board of Education until this was dissolved in 2009.

Recent general elections
 2001 Manx general election
 2006 Manx general election
 2011 Manx general election
 2016 Manx general election
 2021 Manx general election

Historic general elections
 1971 Manx general election
 1976 Manx general election
 1981 Manx general election
 1986 Manx general election
 1991 Manx general election
 1996 Manx general election

See also
House of Keys constituencies
 Electoral calendar
 Electoral system

References

External links
Isle of Man Election Results and Portal
https://www.gov.im/categories/home-and-neighbourhood/elections-and-voting/
Access to work & info of members of Tynwald
Manx Radio Elections Site